Christian Aniche Izuchukwu (born 25 November 1981) is a Nigerian footballer who plays for SoVo in Finland. He also holds a Finnish citizenship.

Career
He played formerly for HIFK, Rakuunat, HDS and Atlantis FC.

References

1981 births
Living people
Atlantis FC players
Nigerian footballers
Nigerian expatriate footballers
Nigerian expatriate sportspeople in Finland
Expatriate footballers in Finland
HIFK Fotboll players
Association football midfielders
Finnish people of Nigerian descent
Naturalized citizens of Finland